Sabalia fulleborni is a moth in the family Brahmaeidae (older classifications placed it in Lemoniidae). It was described by Ferdinand Karsch in 1900.

References

Brahmaeidae
Moths described in 1900